Portenko's shrew (Sorex portenkoi) is a species of mammal in the family Soricidae that is endemic to Russia.

References

Insectivore Specialist Group 1996. Sorex portenkoi. 2006 IUCN Red List of Threatened Species. Downloaded on 30 July 2007.

Sorex
Mammals of Russia
Endemic fauna of Russia
Taxonomy articles created by Polbot
Mammals described in 1956